Karamaly-Gubeyevo (Qaramalı-Ğöbäy) is a rural locality (a selo) and the administrative centre of Karamaly-Gubeyevsky Selsoviet, Tuymazinsky District, Bashkortostan, Russia. The population was 1,120 as of 2010. There are 14 streets.

Geography 
Karamaly-Gubeyevo is located 39 km southeast of Tuymazy (the district's administrative centre) by road. Chukadytamak is the nearest rural locality.

References 

Rural localities in Tuymazinsky District